Braderochus is a genus of beetles in the family Cerambycidae, containing the following species:

 Braderochus dentipes (Chemsak, 1979)
 Braderochus hovorei Santos-Silva & Martins, 2005
 Braderochus jolyi Bleuzen, 1994
 Braderochus levoiturieri (Buquet, 1842)
 Braderochus mundus (White, 1853)
 Braderochus retrospinosus Lameere, 1916
 Braderochus salcedoi Bleuzen, 1994

References

Prioninae